The Japanese  was a  naval gun, the largest ever mounted on a warship.  Only two ships carried them, the Imperial Japanese Navy's World War II battleships Yamato and Musashi. They were designated as a much smaller 40 cm (15.75 in) gun in an effort to hide their true size.

The gun was designed in accordance with the prevailing Japanese naval strategy of Kantai Kessen, the Decisive Battle Doctrine, which presupposed Japan would win a war by fighting and winning a single, decisive naval action.  Essential to that victory was being able to out-gun and out-fight its adversary.  No other ship built could match the firepower and broadside weight of a Yamato-class battleship.

In spite of this, there were no battleship-to-battleship engagements involving either completed vessel of the Yamato-class and an enemy warship.  Both were sunk by aerial attack.

Description
The  46 cm/45 Type 94 naval rifle was a wire-wound gun. Mounted in three 3-gun turrets (nine per ship), they served as the main armament of the two s that were in service with the Imperial Japanese Navy during World War II. When the turrets and the guns were mounted, each weighed 2,510 tons, which is about the same tonnage as an average sized destroyer of the era.

The Japanese guns were of a slightly larger bore than the three British 18 inch naval guns built during World War I, although the shells were not as heavy. Unlike most of the very large guns of other navies, they could fire special anti-aircraft shells (Sanshiki), referred to as "beehive".

Construction 
Some 27 guns were built for the three battleships of the Yamato class. The complex Type 94 barrels were constructed in three autofrettaged stages. A half-length tube was fitted over the first tube and shrunk onto it. The assembly was then wire wound and two additional tubes shrunk over the entire length of the gun tubes. A final inner tube was then inserted down the gun and expanded into place. This inner tube was then rifled to finish the gun. As designed, this gun could not cost effectively be relined but instead had to have the entire gun tube replaced due to wear.

Unlike previous designs the turrets were found to have nothing in common with previous British Vickers designs used in other Japanese battleships when examined by a US naval technical team. Each gun was independently sleeved allowing for separate elevation. The shell hoists and powder rams were found to be ingenious though unduly heavy designs that allowed a relatively rapid rate of reload.  180 shells (60 rounds per gun) were stored in the turret's rotating structure.  The shells were stored vertically and an innovative system of geared mechanical conveyors was employed to move the extremely large and heavy shells from the shell rooms. The mechanical advantage required to move the heavy shells meant these conveyors operated extremely slowly but the 180 shells stored in each turret were considered sufficient for a surface engagement.

Range and flight time
With Type 91 AP shell

Impact angle and velocity
With Type 91 AP shell

See also 
 BL 18 inch Mk I naval gun
 18"/48 caliber Mark 1 gun
 16"/50 caliber Mark 7 gun
 List of naval guns
 List of the largest cannons by caliber

References

Bibliography

External links

 Scottish History - Mons Meg reportedly mounted at sea
 18.1"/45 caliber, Nihon Kaigun
 Japan 46cm/45 (15.9") Type 94 - Actual Size 46cm (18.1"), Navweaps.com
 PIECES LOURDES : 240 et plus, le.fantasque.free.fr

External links

460 mm artillery
Naval guns of Japan
World War II naval weapons
Weapons and ammunition introduced in 1940